Spring Gap is an unincorporated community and census-designated place (CDP) in Allegany County, Maryland, United States. As of the 2010 census it had a population of 55.

 Spring Gap is located in the valley of the North Branch Potomac River along the Chesapeake and Ohio (C&O) Canal at mile marker 173. Just west of the community is the National Park Service Spring Gap Recreation Area, which offers camping sites and a place to relax for hikers and bikers of the C&O towpath. The park is easy to access by car and provides canoe access to the river. The Spring Gap Recreation Area is a popular location to pick up, drop off, or park when hiking or biking the C&O canal towpath to or from Cumberland,  upriver.

Some of the best fishing in the Potomac River is in the section from Spring Gap to Hancock.

Maryland Route 51 runs through Spring Gap, leading northwest to Cumberland and east to Oldtown, and Paw Paw, West Virginia. The mainline CSX railroad runs up the Potomac valley across the river from Spring Gap in West Virginia.

Demographics

Geography
 Elevation:  
 Latitude:   39.5652
 Longitude: -78.71658

References

Census-designated places in Allegany County, Maryland
Census-designated places in Maryland
Populated places in the Cumberland, MD-WV MSA
Cumberland, MD-WV MSA